The Miami Film Festival (formerly Miami International Film Festival) is an annual film festival in Miami, Florida, that showcases independent American and international films with a special focus on Ibero-American films. The competitive film festival draws international and local attention, with films being showcased in several venues across the city center and includes features, documentaries, short films, and retrospectives. The programming is selected so as to include: premiers for both established film-makers and up-and-commers, socially relevant films, multidisciplinary and experimental films, and films showcasing international musicians. The stated mission of the Miami Film Festival is to bridge cultural understanding and encourage artistic development.

History
The Miami Film Festival debuted in February 1984, under the auspices of the Film Society of Miami. It was founded by Nat Chediak and Steven Bowles and directed by Mr. Chediak for its first eighteen years, becoming the City's premier international cultural event. When the City of Miami went bankrupt, control of the festival was assumed by Florida International University in 1999. Dismayed by FIU's stewardship following the event's loss of independence, Chediak left the festival in 2001. Miami-Dade College took over in late 2003 after Florida International University lost $20 million in state funding and incurred an $800,000 deficit.

Since 2006, the beginning of the ten-day festival has shifted to early March. The Festival has now grown to become a comprehensive global festival with an annual attendance of over 70,000. The Festival is held for 10 consecutive days, opening annually on the first Friday of March. In 2014, the festival introduced MIFFecito, a fall presentation. The following year, the festival rebranded it to GEMS Film Festival, a 4-day event held in October to present "the jewels of the fall season."

Jaie Laplante became director of programming in 2011.

References

External links 
 Miami Film Festival Website
 Miami Film Festival Facebook
 Miami Film Festival Instagram
 Miami Film Festival Twitter

Film festivals in Florida
1983 establishments in Florida
Film festivals established in 1983
Festivals in Miami